Jacqueline Andrea Factos Henao (born April 20, 1985) is an Ecuadorian karate martial artist. When she was 19 she joined the Concentracion Deportiva de Pichincha where she is trained by Luis Valdivieso and became part of the National Karate Team.

Biography 
She was born in Quito, Ecuador on April 20, 1985. Her father was Ecuadorian and her mother was Colombian. At 19 years old she lived in Colombia; she then moved to Ecuador where she joined the Concentracion Deportiva de Pichincha. There, she was chosen to form part of the Ecuadorian Karate National Team.  Growing up she practiced a variety of sports including track and field, powerlifting and speed skating before finding karate.

Trophies 
She participated in six Pan American Games finals and won 5, she won silver medal in the World Games and she won a gold medal in the Kazakhstan Open in 2019.

References

External links
 

1985 births
Sportspeople from Quito
Living people
Ecuadorian female karateka
World Games silver medalists
Karateka at the 2015 Pan American Games
World Games medalists in karate
Competitors at the 2013 World Games
Pan American Games competitors for Ecuador
21st-century Ecuadorian women